The members of the 25th General Assembly of Newfoundland were elected in the Newfoundland general election held in May 1923. The general assembly sat from 1923 to 1924.

The Liberal Reform Party, an alliance between the Liberals and the Fishermen's Protective Union, formed the government. Richard Squires served as Newfoundland's prime minister until July 1923 when he resigned as prime minister after his government was accused of misuse of public funds. William Warren succeeded Squires as government leader but his government was defeated by a motion of no confidence in April 1924. A new government led by Albert Hickman was formed bringing together some Liberal Reform MHAs and some MHAs from other parties to form the Liberal-Progressive Party which governed as a caretaker administration for 33 days until the general election held in June 1924.

Harry A. Winter served as speaker.

Sir William Allardyce served as governor of Newfoundland.

Members of the Assembly 
The following members were elected to the assembly in 1923:

Notes:

By-elections 
None

References 

Terms of the General Assembly of Newfoundland and Labrador